The Yamaha MT series is a family of standard/naked bikes manufactured by Yamaha since 2005. The name "MT" stands for "Master of Torque".

Single-cylinder 
 MT-125 (2014–present)
 MT-15 (2018–present)
 MT-03 (2006–2014)

Parallel-twin 
 MT-25 (2015–present)
 MT-03 (2016–present)
 MT-07 (2014–present)

Inline-three 
 MT-09 (2014–present)

Inline-four 
 MT-10 (2016–present)

V-twin 
 MT-01 (2005–2012)

References 

MT series
Standard motorcycles